Consiglio di Rumo is a frazione of the comune of Gravedona ed Uniti , Province of Como, Lombardy, northern Italy, located about  north of Milan and about  northeast of Como, on the border with Switzerland. It was a separate comune until May 16, 2011, when it was annexed by Gravedona, following an act of fusion passed by Lombardy Region.

References

Former municipalities of the Province of Como